Sultana or Sultanah may refer to:

Plants
 Sultana (grape), a "white" oval seedless grape variety
 A type of raisin

Animals
 Sultana (gastropod), a genus of air-breathing land snails
 Western swamphen (also sultana bird), a "swamp hen" in the rail family Rallidae

People
 Sultana (title), a female royal title, and a feminine form of the word sultan
 Sultana (actress), one of the earliest film actresses from India
 Sultana bint Turki Al Sudairi, spouse of Saudi King Salman
 Sultana Frizell (born 1984), Canadian track and field athlete
 Sultana Kamal (born 1950), Bangladeshi lawyer and human rights activist
 Sultana Kamal (athlete) (1952–1975), Bangladeshi athlete
 Farhana Sultana, Bangladeshi environmental scientist
 Gouher Sultana (born 1988), Indian cricketer
 Parveen Sultana (born 1950), Assamese Hindustani classical singer
 Stefan Sultana (born 1968), professional footballer
 Tash Sultana, Australian singer-songwriter
 Zarah Sultana, British Labour Party MP for Coventry South since 2019

Places

Asia
 Sultana, Rajasthan, a town in Jhunjhunu District of the Indian state of Rajasthan

Europe
 Sultana, a village in the Romanian commune of Mânăstirea

Middle East
 Sultanah, Saudi Arabia, a street with various shops and restaurants in Al Madinah Province, in western Saudi Arabia

North America
 Mount Foraker (Sultana), a 17,400-foot mountain in the central Alaska Range, in Denali National Park
 Sultana, California, a census-designated place in Tulare County, California, United States

Oceania
 Sultana Point, a headland near the south east tip of Yorke Peninsula in South Australia
 Sultana Point, South Australia, a locality

Media
 Sultana, a 1988 novel by Jordanian novelist Ghalib Halasa
 Sultana's Dream, a 1905 Bengali feminist utopian story in English, written by Begum Rokeya
 "Sultana", a song from the early 1970s by the Norwegian band Titanic
 The Sultana, a lost 1916 silent film crime drama
 Sultana (film), a 1934 Hindi/Urdu film
 Sultania, botanic journal of Botanical Sciences Bulletin, published in Peshawar, India since 1975

Ships
 Sultana, the flagship of Ali Pasha during the 1571 Battle of Lepanto
 
 , a small Royal Navy schooner
 , a small Royal Navy cutter
 Sultana (steamboat), destroyed in 1865 in the worst maritime disaster in US history 
 , a yacht acquired by the U.S. Navy in World War I